The Connelly-Harrington House is a historic house at 115 East University Street in Siloam Springs, Arkansas.  It is an architecturally eclectic two story brick structure, exhibiting elements of Prairie Style, Classical Revival, and Craftsman architecture.  The house was built c. 1913 for a prominent local banker, and has since served as a hospital and as the offices of the local chamber of commerce.

The house was listed on the National Register of Historic Places in 1988.

See also
National Register of Historic Places listings in Benton County, Arkansas

References

Houses on the National Register of Historic Places in Arkansas
Prairie School architecture in Arkansas
Houses completed in 1913
Houses in Siloam Springs, Arkansas
1913 establishments in Arkansas
National Register of Historic Places in Benton County, Arkansas
Historic district contributing properties in Arkansas